Pinhead Gunpowder is an American punk rock band that formed in East Bay, California, in 1991. The band currently consists of Aaron Cometbus (drums, lyrics), Bill Schneider (bass), Billie Joe Armstrong (guitar, vocals) and Jason White (guitar, vocals). The band's name comes from a brand of "high octane" green tea served at the Arcata co-op and discovered by Aaron Cometbus during one of his many dumpster diving adventures.

History
Pinhead Gunpowder was founded in Arcata, California, in January 1991 by Aaron Cometbus and Jon Quittner. Cometbus wanted the name "Pinhead Gunpowder", while Quittner wanted to call it "50 Foot Hesher". Along with vocalist Doug "Douggie Grime" Rogers and bassist David "Atlas" Kimmel, the band played once at a party where Cometbus snapped his bass pedal in half in the middle of the set. Shortly after the show, Cometbus moved back to Berkeley, taking the name of the band and some of the songs with him. Quittner stayed in Arcata with the band and they changed their name to 50 Foot Hesher and acquired a new drummer. A few months later, Quittner left the band and the remaining members changed the name to "Lank".

Back in Berkeley, Cometbus formed the second incarnation of Pinhead Gunpowder with Bill Schneider and Sarah Kirsch of The Skinflutes, and Billie Joe Armstrong of Green Day. In June 1991, they recorded their first EP, Tründle and Spring. It was not until April of the following year that the band played their first live show at Punks With Presses in Oakland along with Rancid and The Gr'Ups. The band then released their second EP, Fahizah. In 1993, Kirsch left the band citing personal differences with Armstrong's decision to sign to a major label with Green Day.  Kirsch was replaced by Jason White of Chino Horde. Shortly after, the band embarked on a week long tour of Northern California, Oregon, and Washington in the winter of 1994.

Pinhead Gunpowder performed for the first time in many years during February 2008, debuting three new songs, "Anniversary Song", "West Side Highway", and "On the Ave" .

The band released their latest EP, West Side Highway through Recess Records on August 19, 2008. This marked the band's first new release in 5 years.

Pinhead Gunpowder released a greatest hits album called Kick Over the Traces on June 19, 2009. Also, Pinhead Gunpowder mentioned that in August or September Recess would re-release on vinyl and CD the albums Jump Salty, Carry the Banner, Goodbye Ellston Avenue, Shoot the Moon and Compulsive Disclosure. All of the albums were re-released in assorted colors in early February 2010 through Recess Records, but quickly recalled and destroyed at the request of the band due to issues with the vinyl pressing. The band last performed at a benefit show at 924 Gilman Street in Berkeley, California on February 12, 2010.

Band member, Sarah Kirsch, died in 2012, who had been had been diagnosed with Fanconi anemia, a genetic disorder that can cause leukemia and other cancers.

In March 2021. the band re-issued their entire discography on vinyl.

Band members
Current members
 Billie Joe Armstrong - guitar, vocals (1991–present)
 Aaron Cometbus - drums (1991–present)
 Bill Schneider - bass, vocals (1991–present)
 Jason White - guitar, vocals (1994–present)

Former members
 Sarah Kirsch - guitar, vocals (1991–1994; died 2012)

Songwriting
Aaron Cometbus is the primary writer of Pinhead Gunpowder's songs. During Pinhead Gunpowder's first incarnation, Cometbus and Quittner wrote a handful of songs together, including "In Control", "Losers of the Year", "Certain Things", "Brother", "I Used To", "Stab You in the Eye", and "Cuidado" (The last two songs released by Quittner and Cometbus under the band name "Mundt"). Cometbus often borrows songs recorded by his other bands to release as Pinhead Gunpowder songs, including "Train Station" from Shotwell Coho, "The Great Divide" from Redmond Shooting Stars, "Asheville" from Cleveland Bound Death Sentence, and "On the Ave" and "Landlords" from Astrid Oto. Only three Pinhead Gunpowder songs have been written by Billie Joe Armstrong, under the name "Wilhelm Fink". Those are "27", "New Blood", and "Anniversary Song".

Influences 
The bands influences are Ramones, Joni Mitchell, The Replacements, Generation X, Swiz, Code Of Honor, Avengers, and Cheap Trick. They have also done cover versions of many of the songs by these bands or artists.

Discography

Studio albums

Extended plays

Compilation albums

Compilation appearances

References

External links

 Pinhead Gunpowder profile at Punknews.org (Reviews, News, Biography)
 Pinhead Gunpowder on MySpace

Punk rock groups from California
Musical groups from the San Francisco Bay Area
Musical groups established in 1990
Adeline Records artists
Recess Records artists
Hardcore punk groups from California